Chaudhary Mohd Ilyas is an Indian Politician and present member of Haryana Legislative Assembly from Punahana constituency of Nuh district (Haryana). He was elected as  MLA four times. Firstly from Nuh constituency and worked as Irrigation And Power minister from Indian National Congress (1991-1996). Secondly from Ferozepur Jhirka (Vidhan Sabha constituency) and worked as Minister for Animal Husbandry, Fisheries, Dairy Development and WAQF Board (2000-2005). Contested Election of Parliament from Faridabad (Lok Sabha constituency) in 2006 and lost the election with a narrow margin; remained Vice-President of Indian National Lok Dal, Haryana from 2006-2008. And two times MLA from Punahana (Vidhan Sabha constituency) Firstly from (2009-2014) and secondly now on (2019-Present).

Early life
Mohammad Ilyas was born to Late Ch. Rahim Khan (Member of Parliament) on 1 April 1954. He has three brother and four sister. His father Late Ch. Rahim Khan was elected Member of parliament from Faridabad (Lok Sabha constituency) in 1984 and remained Member of Parliament till death on 18 December 1987. He also elected as Member of the Legislative Assembly three times, Firstly in 1967 and secondly 1972 and in last elected in 1982 from Nuh (Vidhan Sabha constituency). His father served as minister thrice in Haryana Government.

Personal
His brother Ch. Habib Ur Rehman Urf Nayab Sahab was elected MLA from Nuh (Vidhan Sabha constituency) (2005-2009). His Uncle Ch. Sardar Khan was elected MLA from Nuh (Vidhan Sabha constituency) and worked as Deputy Home Minister (1977-1982).

He is married to Anwari Begum and has 6 children. He did Bachelor of Arts from Jamia Millia Islamia.

References

Year of birth missing (living people)
Living people
Indian politicians